Gaul Cove is a cove indenting the northeast side of Horseshoe Island, off the coast of Graham Land, Antarctica. It was named by the UK Antarctic Place-Names Committee for Kenneth M. Gaul, first leader of the Falkland Islands Dependencies Survey Horseshoe Island station in 1955.

See also
Russet Pikes

References

Coves of Graham Land
Fallières Coast